"When the Tingle Becomes a Chill" is a song written by Lola Jean Dillon that was originally performed by American country music artist Loretta Lynn. It was released as a single in October 1975 via MCA Records.

Background and reception 
"When the Tingle Becomes a Chill" was recorded at the Bradley's Barn on August 29, 1974. Located in Mount Juliet, Tennessee, the session was produced by renowned country music producer Owen Bradley. Two additional tracks were recorded during this session.

"When the Tingle Becomes a Chill" reached number two on the Billboard Hot Country Singles survey in 1975. Additionally, the song peaked at number three on the Canadian RPM Country Songs chart during the same period. It was included on her studio album, When the Tingle Becomes a Chill (1976).

Track listings 
7" vinyl single
 "When the Tingle Becomes a Chill" – 2:59
 "All I Want from You (Is Away)" – 2:13

Charts

References 

1975 songs
1975 singles
MCA Records singles
Loretta Lynn songs
Song recordings produced by Owen Bradley
Songs written by Lola Jean Dillon